Stauper is an archipelago in the Tønsbergfjord that belongs to Sandefjord, Norway. It consists of 170 decares (17 ha, 42 acres) of rocky islands, islets, and skerries, that are only accessible by boat. Stauper consists of 21 islands, including Betjenterholmen (0,03 km²), Terneskjær, Teholmen, Stauperkollen, Kistholmen, Langholmen, Ærholmen, Stauperluva, Lyngholmen, Torgerskjær, and Helgerødskjær. They are located in-between East Island in Sandefjord and Tjøme Island.

The islands consist of deep bays, long straits, cliff formations, and round rocks and skerries. Naturally occurring plants on the islands include European red raspberry, Wild pansy, Sea thrift, and Yellow toadflax. Several cabins were previously located on the island Betjenterholmen. Despite its location in-between Flautangen (Østerøya) and Lindholmen (Tjøme) in the Tønsbergfjord, the archipelago belongs to the municipality of Sandefjord. It consists of ten large islands and a number of smaller skerries and islets.

It is particularly popular during the summer months for recreational activities including swimming, sun bathing, kayaking, diving, boating, fishing, and camping. It consists of four larger islands, four small islands, and a number of islets. Public toilets and trash cans have been installed on the islands, however, the islands have no piers or established campground facilities. The islands are popular for boaters during summer. While there are no sandy beaches on the islands, they are used for jumping, diving, and snorkeling.

Since 2012, Pernille Sjølett Hansen has held annual concerts on the islands.

References

Sandefjord
Islands of Vestfold og Telemark
Archipelagoes of Norway